Veselin Staevski (born 21 January 1941) is a Bulgarian rower. He competed in the men's coxed pair event at the 1968 Summer Olympics.

References

1941 births
Living people
Bulgarian male rowers
Olympic rowers of Bulgaria
Rowers at the 1968 Summer Olympics
People from Troyan